Hugo Ballivián Rojas (7 June 1901 – 15 July 1993) was a Bolivian politician and military officer who served as the de facto 44th president of Bolivia from 1951 to 1952. A career military officer, he was Commander of the Bolivian Armed Forces when President Mamerto Urriolagoitía called upon him to take over as extra-Constitutional chief executive in order to prevent the swearing-in of the reform-minded President-elect, Víctor Paz Estenssoro. This was a self-coup that became popularly known as the Mamertazo. Installing himself in the Palacio Quemado, Ballivián was the oligarchy's last hope to "turn back the hands of the clock," but the situation was apparently beyond repair. Despite declaring a nationwide curfew and exiling and imprisoning a number of opposition leaders, the demonstrations, work stoppages, and uprisings continued.

Matters came to a head when Ballivián's Minister of Government, General Antonio Seleme, secretly pledged his support to the plotters, then led by Hernán Siles Zuazo (since Paz Estenssoro was at the time exiled in Argentina). This catalyzed the events of April 9-11, 1952, that have come to be known as the Bolivian National Revolution, or the 1952 Revolution. They mark an important watershed in the history of Bolivia, routing the supporters of Ballivián, which included large sectors of the Bolivian armed forces. Defections to the rebel camp tilted the scales, and following various days of violent armed confrontation the President sought asylum in the Chilean Embassy. Thus at long last expired the last government of 1880-1952 period.

Vilified by many as the last leader of the Old Regime, and seen in more benign terms by others as a general doing his duty as he was entrusted to at an extremely difficult time in Bolivian history, Hugo Ballivián Rojas died in 1993, long retired from any political activity. He was 92 years old.

Sources 
Mesa José de; Gisbert, Teresa; and Carlos D. Mesa, Historia de Bolivia, 3rd edition., pp. 584–587.  

1901 births
1993 deaths
20th-century Bolivian politicians
Bolivian generals
Leaders ousted by a coup
Leaders who took power by coup
Military College of the Army alumni
People from La Paz
People of the Chaco War
Presidents of Bolivia